Charles Csuri (July 4, 1922 – February 27, 2022), better known as Chuck Csuri, was an American artist and computer art pioneer, described by the Smithsonian magazine as the "father of digital art and computer animation."

Biography

Digital art
Csuri created his first digital art pieces in 1964, and was quickly recognized by the Museum of Modern Art (MoMA) and the Association for Computing Machinery Special Interest Group Graphics (ACM SIGGRAPH). In particular, his 1967 short film Hummingbird, a collaboration with James Shaffer, is in MoMa's permanent collection as one of the earliest surviving examples of computer animation. Csuri taught for over forty years at Ohio State University, and between 1971 and 1987 established a series of groundbreaking graphics research centers there: the Computer Graphics Research Group, the Ohio Supercomputer Graphics Project, and Cranston/Csuri Productions, which spun off from the university in 1981 to become one of the world's first computer animation production companies. In 1987, these groups combined to form the Advanced Computing Center for Arts and Design (ACCAD), which remains in operation as of 2022. In 2000, Csuri received an Ohio Governor's Award for the Arts and Ohio State's Sullivant Medal, the institution's highest honor, in acknowledgement of his lifetime achievements. A retrospective exhibit of seventy of Csuri's artworks,  titled Beyond Boundaries, traveled to museums throughout Europe and Asia in 2010. Other notable works by Csuri include Random War (1967), Sine Curve Man (1967), Wondrous Spring (1992), Spinning (1994), A Happy Time (1996), Random War Pics (2013), Despair (2016), Doddle (2016), Old Age (2016), and ribFIG (2016).

College football career
Csuri attended Ohio State on a football scholarship. He became captain of their first national championship football team, and is in the College Football Hall of Fame as MVP in the 1942 Big Ten Conference. He was selected in the 1944 NFL Draft by the Chicago Cardinals (16th round, 154th overall pick), but declined the offer in order to serve in World War II.

Military service
Csuri served in the U.S. Army from 1943 to 1946, receiving the Bronze Star in 1945 for heroism in the Battle of the Bulge.

Teaching career
Csuri returned to Ohio State and completed his MA in art in 1948. In 1949, he joined the faculty of the Department of Art at the university. He became a full Professor of Art Education in 1978, a Professor of Computer Information Science in 1986, and Professor Emeritus in 1990.

Personal life
Csuri was born in Grant Town, West Virginia, on July 4, 1922, to parents from Hungary. He grew up in Cleveland, Ohio. He died in Lakewood Ranch, Florida, on February 27, 2022, at the age of 99.

References

External links
 
 Oral history interview with Charles A. Csuri, Charles Babbage Institute, University of Minnesota. Csuri recounts his art education and explains his transition to computer graphics in the mid-1960s.
 The Charles A. Csuri Project at the Ohio State University
 Charles Csuri's profile at Siggraph
 Fitzsimmons, Kevin.  "Gov. Taft recognizes OSU's Csuri as the state's best individual artist".  OnCampus Online, Vol. 29, No. 18. https://web.archive.org/web/20110929232136/http://oncampus.osu.edu/v29n18/thisissue_6.html
 Gold, Virginia.  "ACM SIGGRAPH ANNOUNCES WINNER OF 2011 AWARD FOR LIFETIME ACHIEVEMENT IN DIGITAL ART".  The Association for Computing Machinery, https://web.archive.org/web/20110927055828/http://accad.osu.edu/assets/files/Csuri_SIGGAward2011.pdf

1922 births
2022 deaths
American digital artists
Artists from West Virginia
Computer graphics professionals
Ohio State Buckeyes football players
Ohio State University faculty
United States Army personnel of World War II
United States Army soldiers
People from Marion County, West Virginia
Military personnel from West Virginia